The DuPont Experimental Station is the largest research and development facility of DuPont. Located on the banks of the Brandywine Creek in Wilmington, Delaware, it is home to a range of major discoveries of the modern chemical industry.

Overview 
The Experimental Station marked its 100th anniversary in 2003. It was founded as an effort to move the DuPont Company from gunpowder and explosives into the new age of chemistry.[1] The site overlooks the original powder mills upon which the company was founded - now Hagley Museum and Library. The Experimental Station is east from Hagley Museum and west-southwest from Nemours Children's Hospital, Delaware.

As one of the first industrial research laboratories in the United States, the  campus-style Experimental Station in Wilmington, Delaware, serves as the primary research and development facility for DuPont. It is home to DuPont's Central Research and most other business units of DuPont are also represented on site. The Experimental Station is where many original materials and products were developed by DuPont since 1903, including:

 Neoprene - the world's first synthetic rubber
 Nylon polyamide for fibers and engineering polymers for machine parts, gears, electrical systems and automobile air intake manifolds
 Tyvek nonwovens for housewrap, envelopes, medical packaging, environmental protection and currency
 Kevlar fiber for body armor and automobile tire reinforcement;
 Mylar polyester film for packaging material and balloons
 Corian solid surface materials for countertops, flooring and art.
 Butacite polyvinyl butyral, the safety interlayer in laminated glass
 Nomex fiber for firefighting equipment and other thermal protection applications
 Simple crown ethers, which were invented by Charles J. Pedersen in 1967 (he won a Nobel Prize for the work in 1987; there is a plaque at the Experimental Station marking the location of the lab where his work took place)
 Herbicides of plant hormone–analogue types (a building at the Experimental Station is named for George Levitt, a lead research chemist on these projects)

For a more complete description of the inventions of the scientists and engineers of the Experimental Station, see the List of DuPont Experimental Station Inventions.

Today nearly 2,000 scientists and researchers - including roughly 600 with Ph.D.s - pursue new opportunities for a broad range of global markets including agriculture and nutrition, electronics, safety and protection, coatings and performance materials. There are over 50 buildings encompassing 250,000 square meters of research space. This centralized facility is intended to allow collaborations to enhance scientific discovery. More recent successes include Suva refrigerants, the BAX food safety systems and Sorona polyester.

Research and development now under way includes nanotechnology, emerging video display technologies, fuel cells, and biomaterials produced from renewable resources such as corn. These developments could lead to foods that help prevent diseases and brittle bones, "smart" materials that can adjust performance on their own, microorganisms that produce biodegradable products and innovative materials for personal protection.

On the morning of January 24, 2007, President George W. Bush became the first president to visit the Experimental Station. He saw examples of how DuPont is putting science to work to provide products for agricultural energy crops, feedstock processing and advanced biofuels such as ethanol and bio-butanol. He also viewed other alternative energy sources and technologies dealing with energy conservation. These are all part of DuPont’s sustainable growth mission.

References

External links 
 Timeline of discoveries at the DuPont Experimental Station
 Experimental Station in the history of DuPont

DuPont
Research organizations in the United States
Chemical research institutes